Cormac McCann (born 8 February 1964) is an Irish former cyclist. He competed in two events at the 1988 Summer Olympics held in Seoul.

References

1964 births
Living people
Irish male cyclists
Olympic cyclists of Ireland
Cyclists at the 1988 Summer Olympics
Place of birth missing (living people)
Commonwealth Games medallists in cycling
Commonwealth Games bronze medallists for Northern Ireland
Cyclists at the 1986 Commonwealth Games
Medallists at the 1986 Commonwealth Games